Cripplers is a limited vinyl only 7-inch EP by the hardcore punk band This Is Hell. It features cover songs, unreleased songs, and one new song "Infected" later to be featured on their 2008 album Misfortunes. However, this track is an earlier recording and sounds slightly different from the track found on Misfortunes.

Track listing
Side F
 "Infected" (Early recording) – 2:44
 "Do Something" (Originally by CIV) – 1:20
 "Fight for Your Right" (Originally by Beastie Boys) – 3:04
Side U
 "Another Facade" (Unreleased song) – 0:59
 "Double Grave" (Unreleased song) – 1:25
 "I Hope You Die Soon" (Originally by The Movielife) – 0:35

Pressing details
Limited quantities were pressed in a variety of colors.
Black/Clear Splatter (Hand Screened) x100
Red/Orange Swirl x200
Yellow x300
Black/White Swirl x400
Red/Yellow x500
Clear/Black Splatter x500

Personnel
Travis Reilly - Vocals
Rick Jimenez - Guitar & Backing Vocals
Chris Reynolds - Guitar
Johnny Moore - Bass
Dan Bourke - Drums
Tomas Costanza & Dean Baltulons - Recording
Logo designed by Jeff Tiu
Photography by Matt Miller
Layout by Raging $kull

References

This Is Hell (band) albums